Drew Commesso (born July 19, 2002) is an American collegiate ice hockey goaltender who is currently playing for Boston University in Hockey East. He was selected by the Chicago Blackhawks in the second round, 46th overall, of the 2020 NHL Entry Draft.

Playing career

Youth
Commesso competed for the USA Hockey National Team Development Program.

College
Commesso plays for the Boston University Terriers, where he is the starting goaltender. He was selected in the second round by the Chicago Blackhawks in the 2020 NHL Entry Draft.

International play
Commesso competed in the 2022 Winter Olympics, where he became the youngest starting goaltender in United States history.  In his debut against China, he earned a shutout while recording 29 saves.

Commesso was also on the roster at the 2019 IIHF World U18 Championships, 2021 IIHF World Championship, and 2022 World Junior Ice Hockey Championships.

References

External links
\

2002 births
Living people
American ice hockey goaltenders
Boston University Terriers men's ice hockey players
Chicago Blackhawks draft picks
Ice hockey players at the 2022 Winter Olympics
Olympic ice hockey players of the United States
USA Hockey National Team Development Program players